This Life of Mine is a novella by Lao She. The play was filmed as This Life of Mine in 1950.

References

Novels by Lao She
Chinese novellas
Chinese novels adapted into plays

Novels set in Beijing